The KrAZ H30.1E or KrAZ 7140H6 off-road truck 8x6 is manufactured at the KrAZ plant in Ukraine.  It was first presented in the 2004 year. 

KrAZ H30.1E is provided engine YaMZ-6581.10 rated at 400-420 hp, the YaMZ-184 clutch and the YaMZ-2391 mechanical transmission.

Technical characteristics 
Engine: YaMZ-6581.10
Power: 400 PS (294 kW) /1900 rpm
Transmission: mechanical YaMZ-2391
Clutch: single disk YaMZ-184
Axle configuration: 8x6
Tires: 445/65R22,5
Payload: 30,000 kg

References 

KrAZ vehicles
Cars of Ukraine